The Rio de Janeiro Olympic Golf Course is a golf course built for the golf tournaments of the 2016 Summer Olympics, within the Marapendi Natural Reserve in the Barra da Tijuca zone of Rio de Janeiro, Brazil.

The golf course was designed by Gil Hanse and the clubhouse chosen by competition, won by Pedro Évora and Pedro Rivera, from the Brazilian office Rua Arquitetos. 

Golf returned to the Olympics in 2016 after more than a century, last played in 1904, and featured two events, the men's and women's individual events.

After the Summer Olympics ended, the golf course was opened to the public.  The golf course has become a host to junior golf tournaments and introductory days to novice golfers.

Scorecard (metres)

Scorecard (yards)

Any discrepancy between metre and yard distances is due to round off error when converting from SI units to USC units.

References

External links
International Golf Federation - Olympic Venue (igfgolf.org)
2016 Rio Olympics Golf: The course golf-monthly.co.uk
Hanse Golf Course Design hansegolfdesign.com
Golf in an environmental protection zone urbecarioca.blogspot.com 

Parks in Rio de Janeiro (city)
Venues of the 2016 Summer Olympics
Olympic golf venues
Sports venues completed in 2016
2016 establishments in Brazil
Golf in Brazil